Alloy 28 or Sanicro 28 (trade name) is an alloy of iron which contains nickel and chromium. It is a material often used to withstand corrosion from oxidation, rusting. It is especially resistant to sulfuric acid and phosphoric acid. They are typically used by natural gas and oil transportation, Nuclear fuel transportation, acid manufacturing and transportation services.

See also
 Stainless steel

References

Ferrous alloys